Sub-subunit or sub-sub-unit is a subordinated element below platoon level of company-sized units or sub-units which normally might  not be separately identified in authorization documents by name, number, or letter. Fireteams, squads, crews, sections and patrols are typically sub-subunits.

Types of sub-units

 Legend

References

Military units and formations by size